The 1998 ISF Women's World Championship for softball was held July 20–30, 1998 in Fujinomiya, Shizuoka, Japan.  A fourth straight title was won by the team from the United States, coached by Margie Wright, which avenged its only loss of the tournament to Australia by a 1-0 margin in the final.

Pool Play

Group I

Group II

Playoffs

Day One

Venezuela and Chinese Taipei Eliminated.

Day Two

Italy and Canada Eliminated.

Day Three

Medal Round

External links 
ISF

Softball
Women's Softball World Championship
1998
Sport in Shizuoka Prefecture
Softball World Championship
July 1998 sports events in Asia